Rukirabasaija Kakende Nyamuyonjo was Omukama of the Kingdom of Toro from 1875 until 1876 and from 1879 until 1880. He was the eighth (8th) Omukama of Tooro.

Claim to the throne

Married life
married Logose a musoga from the baise igaga Clan

Offspring

Omukama Kakende fathered three children with his wife logose namely;- one son Katunku Zephania and two daughters Bulage and Mpindi.

His reign
1875–1876 and 1879–1880  Omukama Kakende was raised to the throne in 1995 following the flight of his older brother, Rububi Kyebambe II, with the help of an invading army from Buganda. However, when the army left Toro in 1876, Omukama Kakende left with them. He returned with another army from Buganda in 1879 and deposed his brother Rububi Kyebambe II. He ruled until 1880.

The final years
In 1880, Toro was invaded by an army from Bunyoro. The invaders expelled Omukama Kakende, who first took refuge in Ankole and later in Buganda. Omukama Kakende died from smallpox in Buganda, prior to 1885. He was buried at Busimba Zone, Mpogo, Sironko District.

Succession table:First time

Succession table:Second time

See also
 Omukama of Toro

References

Toro
19th-century rulers in Africa